The White Knight is a biography of the author Lewis Carroll by Alexander L. Taylor, first published in 1952.

References

1952 non-fiction books
Biographies about writers
Lewis Carroll